Maria Pavlowna is a 1919 German silent drama film directed by Emil Justitz and starring Maria Fein, Ernst Rückert and Ernst Stahl-Nachbaur. It premiered at the Marmorhaus in Berlin.

Cast
 Maria Fein as Maria Pavlowna 
 Ernst Rückert as Boris Lensky 
 Ernst Stahl-Nachbaur as Polizist Maximowitsch 
 Kurt Walter as Sergej 
 Ray Walton as Alexandra

References

Bibliography
 Paolo Caneppele. Entscheidungen der Tiroler Filmzensur 1919-1920-1921: mit einem Index der in Tirol verbotenen Filme 1916-1922. Film Archiv Austria, 2002.

External links

1919 films
Films of the Weimar Republic
Films directed by Emil Justitz
German silent feature films